Gujba is a town and Local Government Area in Yobe State, Nigeria. Its headquarters are situated in Buni Yadi at  towards the south of the area; the eponymous town of Gujba lies in the north of the area. The postal code of the area is 621. The town serves as the seat of the Gujba Emirate.

See also
Gujba Forest Reserve
 List of Local Government Areas in Yobe State

References

Local Government Areas in Yobe State